Floppy disk format and density refer to the logical and physical layout of data stored on a floppy disk.  Since their introduction, there have been many popular and rare floppy disk types, densities, and formats used in computing, leading to much confusion over their differences.  In the early 2000s, most floppy disk types and formats became obsolete, leaving the -inch disk, using an IBM PC compatible format of 1440 KB, as the only remaining popular format.

Different floppy disk types had different recording characteristics, with varying magnetic coercivity (measured in oersteds, or in modern SI units in amperes per meter), ferrite grain size, and tracks per inch (TPI).  TPI was not a part of the physical manufacturing process; it was a certification of how closely tracks of data could be spaced on the medium safely.

The term density has a double meaning for floppy disks.  Originally, single density and double density indicated a difference in logical encoding on the same type of physical media: FM for single, and MFM for double.  Subsequent use of the term "density" referred to physical characteristics of the media, with MFM assumed to be the logical format used.  GCR was also used on some platforms, but typically in a "double" density form.

8- and -inch floppy disks were available with both soft sectoring and hard sectoring.  Because of the similarity in magnetic characteristics between some disk types, it was possible to use an incorrectly certified disk in a soft sectored drive.  Quad density -inch disks were rare, so it was not uncommon to use higher quality double density disks, which were usually capable of sustaining the 96 TPI formatting of quad density, in drives such as the Commodore 8050.

Disks were available in both single and double sided forms, with double sided formats providing twice the storage capacity.  Like TPI, "double sided" was mostly a certification indicator, as the magnetic media was usually recordable on both sides.  Many (but not all) certified "double sided" 8- and -inch floppies had an index hole on both sides of the disk sleeve to make them usable as flippy disks.

A combination floppy disk and optical disc, known as a Floptical disk exists. The size of a -inch (90 mm) disk, they are capable of holding close to 20.8 MB, but need a special drive.

Sectoring
The formatted disk capacity is always less than the "raw" unformatted capacity specified by the disk's manufacturer, because some portion of each track is used for sector identification and for gaps (empty spaces) between sectors and at the end of the track.

In hard-sectored 8-inch and -inch formats, each track is divided into a particular number of sectors determined when the disk is manufactured. Holes are punched in the magnetic media to indicate where each sector should start (in an area closer to the center of the disk than is used for magnetic recording). An additional hole is punched near one of the sector holes to identify the start of the track. A sensor in the drive detects the holes in the magnetic media as they align with a hole in the disk jacket.

Data is generally written at a fixed number of bits per second, with only a very small percentage of variation due to component tolerances, so given the nominal speed that the disk rotates it is possible to calculate the number of degrees a given number of bytes will occupy when written. In practice the motor speed varies, especially from one drive to another, resulting in those bytes occupying more degrees of the track at high motor speeds or fewer degrees at low motor speeds.

When a soft-sectored disk is low-level "formatted", each track is written with a number of bytes calculated to fit within 360 degrees at the highest expected motor speed. Special bit patterns are written right before the location where a sector should start, and serve as identifiers, similar to the punched holes used by hard-sectored disks. Thus, the full constellation of punched holes is not needed, and only a single hole is retained, to indicate the start of the track (-inch disks use an alignment pin rather than a hole). If the motor is spinning any slower than the highest acceptable speed, which is usually the case, the data will fit in fewer than 360 degrees, resulting in a gap at the end of the track. Additionally, if a sector were to be rewritten on a drive running faster than the drive was running when the track was formatted, the new data would be larger (occupy more degrees of rotation) than the original sector. Therefore, during formatting a gap must be left between sectors to allow a rewritten sector to be larger without over-writing the following sector.

Commodore's Amiga used an unusual format which got closer to the disk's raw (unformatted) capacity by eliminating the gaps between sectors and simplifying the identification data. This meant that individual sectors could not be rewritten; the Amiga would simply rewrite the entire track.

Single Sided, Double Density
Formatted capacity numbers are based on the resulting number of logical sectors and the byte payload they can carry, that is, they depend on the physical parameters and modulation, but are independent of a particular file system. Sometimes floppies are superformatted to use more tracks or sectors per track to accommodate slightly more data. Some floppy-based Linux distributions utilize such techniques. For comparison purposes, formatted capacities given in this section assume standard disk geometries as they are supported by common operating systems in their default configuration.

The maximum usable capacity is file-system and configuration specific and always lower than the formatted capacity, since the file system occupies a number of the available sectors for control structures as well.

Most floppy disks used by PCs use the FAT12 file system format, which imposes certain practical defaults on the logical geometry in order to be recognizable by all operating systems. Sometimes disks may use a more exotic file system.

SSDD originally referred to Single Sided, Double Density, a format of (usually -inch) floppy disks which could typically hold 35-40 tracks of nine 512-byte (or 18 256-byte) sectors each. Only one side of the disc was used, although some users did discover that punching additional holes into the disc jacket would allow the creation of a "flippy" disc which could be manually turned over to store additional data on the reverse side.

Single-sided disks began to become obsolete after the introduction of IBM PC DOS 1.1 in 1982, which added support for double-side diskette drives with capacity of 320 KB to the IBM 5150 PC. In 1983 PC DOS 2.0 pushed the formatting capacity to 180 KB single-sided or 360 KB double-sided by utilizing 9 instead of only 8 sectors per track.

Known disk logical formats

Throughout the 1970s and 1980s, many different disk formats were used, depending on the hardware platform. Variables included the size of media (nominal 8-inch, -inch, -inch and others), encoding of data on the media (FM, MFM, M²FM, GCR), the number of disk tracks, one or two sides, the number of sectors in each track, and hard- or soft-sectoring. Even media that was physically interchangeable between two systems might not have been usable owing to particulars of the arrangement of data on the disk.

See also
Double-sided disk

Notes

References
 

Floppy disk computer storage